Judith Shuval (born 1926) is an Israeli professor emerita of sociology who taught at the Hebrew University of Jerusalem, specializing in public health and immigration.

Biography
Judith Tannenbaum Shuval was born in 1926 in New York City. She attended Hunter College and later earned a bachelor's degree from the Jewish Theological Seminary. In 1949, she immigrated to Israel and worked at the Israel Institute of Applied Social Research. She completed her Ph.D. in sociology from Radcliffe College at Harvard University in 1955. That same year, she was appointed an adviser on immigrant absorption for UNESCO.

Shuval was hired by the Hebrew University in Jerusalem as a lecturer in sociology in 1968. She eventually became the Louis and Pearl Rose Professor of Medical Sociology. During the 1978–1979 academic year, and again in 1981, she was a visiting professor of sociology at the University of Michigan at Ann Arbor.

She also represented Israel at the European Society for Health and Medical Sociology in 1983 and served as chairwoman of the Israeli Sociological Association from 1986 to 1988.

Shuval retired in 1994.

Awards and honors

 In 1959, Shuval received the Helen De-Roy prize, given by the Society for the Study of Social Problems.
 In 1965, she was awarded the Israel Prize for sociology.
 In 1995, Hadassah awarded her the Henrietta Szold Award for public medicine and hygiene.

Publications 

 Immigrants on the Threshold 1963 
 The Dynamics of Transition: Entering Medicine 1979
 Social Functions of Medical Practice (with A. Antonovsky and A.M. Davies) 1970
 Newcomers and Colleagues: Soviet Immigrant Physicians in Israel 1984
 Immigrant Physicians: Former Soviet Doctors in Israel, Canada and the United States (with J.H.Bernstein) 1997 
 Immigration to Israel: Sociological Perspectives (with E.Leshem) 1998 [Immigration to Israel: Sociological Perspectives]
 Social Structure and Health in Israel (with O.Anson) 2000

References

See also
List of Israel Prize recipients

Israel Prize women recipients
Israel Prize in social sciences recipients
20th-century American Jews
American emigrants to Israel
Israeli Jews
1926 births
Living people
Radcliffe College alumni
Academic staff of the Hebrew University of Jerusalem
University of Michigan faculty
Hunter College alumni
21st-century American Jews